Maotai or Moutai is a style of baijiu, a distilled Chinese liquor (spirit), made in the town of Maotai in China's Guizhou province. Produced by the state-owned Kweichow Moutai Company, it is distilled from fermented sorghum and comes in several different varieties. Maotai uses simple materials such as grain and water to produce its flavor. After four years of brewing in urns, it is ready to be sold.

Maotai originated during the Qing Dynasty (1644–1912), when northern Chinese distillers introduced advanced techniques to local processes to create a distinctive type of baijiu. Thereafter Maotai was produced at several local distilleries. During the Chinese Civil War, People's Liberation Army forces camped at Maotai and partook of the local liquor. Following the Communist victory in the war, the government consolidated the local distilleries into one state-owned company, Kweichow Moutai (the name is an old romanization of "Guizhou Maotai"). It became a very popular drink at state functions and one of the country's most popular spirits.

History
Maotai became the first Chinese liquor to be produced in large-scale, with an annual output of 170 tons. In 2007,  more than 6,800 tons of Maotai were sold. Maotai is named after the town of the same name near Zunyi in Renhuai, Guizhou Province, where liquor distillery has a very long history. The Maotai of today originated during the Qing Dynasty and first won international fame when winning a gold medal at the 1915 Panama-Pacific Exposition in San Francisco.

During the Chinese Civil War, the current legend goes that the Red Army used Maotai to lift the spirits of their soldiers and disinfect wounds during the Battle of Chishui River. The Red Army victory in this battle is widely recognised as one of the tipping points in their eventual victory over the Kuomintang forces. Ever since then, Moutai has been used at state banquets and celebrations.

Maotai was named a national liquor in 1951, two years after the founding of People's Republic of China. Maotai also claimed two gold medals separately at the Paris International Exposition in 1985 and 1986. Maotai has won 14 international awards and 20 domestic awards since the Chinese Revolution.

Maotai has been used on official occasions in feasts with foreign heads of state and distinguished guests visiting China. It is the only alcoholic beverage presented as an official gift by Chinese embassies in foreign countries and regions. It received wide exposure in China and abroad when Zhou Enlai used the liquor to entertain Richard Nixon during the state banquet for the U.S. presidential visit to China in 1972. Zhou told Nixon that Maotai had been famous since it won recognition at the San Francisco World's Fair in 1915, and that during the Long March, "Maotai was used by us to cure all kinds of diseases and wounds." Nixon replied, "let me make a toast with this panacea." When Deng Xiaoping visited the United States in 1979, Henry Kissinger told him "I think if we drink enough Moutai we can solve anything."

Maotai became both the drink of choice for greeting foreign dignitaries and the bribe of choice to high officials. Counterfeiters moved in to meet the new demand, and other distilleries copied the methods of the state-owned enterprise.

Maotai currently sells over 200 tons of Maotai to over 100 countries and regions across the world.

In 2018, Maotai saw its output reach about 70,200 tons, with sales revenues reaching 73.6 billion yuan (about 10.5 billion dollars) and net profit 35.2 billion yuan (about 5 billion dollars).

Gallery

References

Baijiu
Guizhou